Corona is an unincorporated community in Carlton County, in the U.S. state of Minnesota.

History
A post office was established at Corona in 1910, and remained in operation until it was discontinued in 1921. The name Corona, derived from Latin and meaning "crown", may be allusive of the lofty elevation of the place.

References

Unincorporated communities in Carlton County, Minnesota
Unincorporated communities in Minnesota